The Aurora County Courthouse, located in Plankinton, South Dakota is a building in the Art Moderne and Art Deco styles.

It was built in 1940 and added to the National Register of Historic Places in 1993.  It was one of four county courthouses in South Dakota designed by architects Kings & Dixon.

As of 2013, the building served as the county courthouse for Aurora County.

References

Courthouses on the National Register of Historic Places in South Dakota
Streamline Moderne architecture in the United States
Art Deco architecture in South Dakota
Government buildings completed in 1940
Buildings and structures in Aurora County, South Dakota
County courthouses in South Dakota
National Register of Historic Places in Aurora County, South Dakota